Marshville   is a community in the Canadian province of Nova Scotia, located in  Pictou County on Nova Scotia Trunk 6.

Rushton's Beach Provincial Park is situated here on the shore of Amet Sound. This 18.93 ha park provides boardwalk access to the beach across saltmarsh which attracts a variety of birds.

References

Communities in Pictou County
General Service Areas in Nova Scotia